U.S. Route 24 (US 24) is a part of the U.S. Highway System that travels from Minturn, Colorado, to Clarkston, Michigan. In the U.S. state of Colorado US 24 extends from Interstate 70 (I-70) and US 6 in Minturn east to the Kansas state line where it continues as US 24 concurrent with I-70.

Route description

US 24 traverses the Rocky Mountains, starting near Minturn. It then continues southeast for about 30 miles to Leadville, where it turns south and goes to Buena Vista where it becomes concurrent with US 285. It continues with Highway 285 to the small community of Antero Junction. After that, it spends its time as a mountainous two-lane highway until it gets to the town of Divide, where it meets SH 67 and becomes a 4 lane highway. These highways overlap to Woodland Park. From there it passes through Crystola, Green Mountain Falls, and Cascade. Through Manitou Springs and Colorado Springs, where the road is known as Midland Expressway.  Just east of Interstate 25, it is known as the Martin Luther King Jr Bypass.  From Colorado Springs it continues northeast through several towns such as Falcon, Peyton, the city of Calhan, Ramah, Simla, and Matheson. When US 24 reaches Limon, it junctions with I-70/US 40/US 287/SH 71. It continues east (parallel to I-70) to Burlington where it joins I-70 to the Kansas state line.

Junction list

See also

 List of U.S. Highways in Colorado

References

External links

 Colorado
24
Eastern Plains
Transportation in Eagle County, Colorado
Transportation in Lake County, Colorado
Transportation in Chaffee County, Colorado
Transportation in Park County, Colorado
Transportation in Teller County, Colorado
Transportation in El Paso County, Colorado
Transportation in Elbert County, Colorado
Transportation in Lincoln County, Colorado
Transportation in Kit Carson County, Colorado
1936 establishments in Colorado